Sparky Marcus (born Marcus Issoglio; December 6, 1967) is an American former actor.

Early life
Marcus was born in Hollywood, California.

Career
Marcus was well known for playing the role of the precocious child but also worked extensively as a voice actor for Hanna-Barbera throughout the 1980s.  He started acting at five playing Shelby on Sigmund and the Sea Monsters (1973–1975). He also appeared on The Nancy Walker Show (1976), Mary Hartman, Mary Hartman (1976–77) (Marcus played child evangelist Jimmy Joe Jeeter, who died of electrocution in the bathtub), Grandpa Goes to Washington (1978), The Bad News Bears and Goodtime Girls (1980).

Voice acting
As a voice actor for cartoons, he is probably best known for his role as Richie Rich from the Hanna Barbera series Richie Rich (1980–1982). He later had regular roles as a voice actor on Shirt Tales (1982–1984), Space Stars (1981), Saturday Supercade as the voice of Dexter on Space Ace (1984), Challenge of the GoBots (1984), The Puppy's Further Adventures (1983), The Reluctant Dragon (1981), Cabbage Patch Kids: First Christmas (1984), Banjo the Woodpile Cat (1979),  CBS Library (1980–1982) and The Get Along Gang (1984–86).

Television guest appearances
Marcus has also made several TV guest appearances, including Trapper John, M.D., Happy Days, WKRP in Cincinnati, What's Happening!!, Maude, Emergency!, The Hardy Boys/Nancy Drew Mysteries, The Bob Newhart Show, Eight Is Enough and Starsky and Hutch.

Film roles
Marcus also appeared in the feature films Freaky Friday (1976) and The Pinballs (1977), as well as in many TV movies, including The Stableboy's Christmas (1978) and Goldie and the Boxer (1979).  His last movie role was a brief cameo as a bellboy in the 1983 Steve Martin comedy The Man with Two Brains.

Filmography

References

External links 
 

American male voice actors
American male child actors
American male film actors
American male television actors
1967 births
Living people
Male actors from Hollywood, Los Angeles